New Century House is an office building with an attached conference hall, in the NOMA district of Manchester, England. There is office space, conference facilities, catering facilitates and a gym.

History

Co-operative Group
New Century House was designed by G. S. Hay and Gordon Tait and constructed by John Laing & Son for the Co-operative Insurance Society in 1962. The attached New Century Hall has a capacity of 1,000 people. New Century House and Hall were listed in 1995 as Grade II as a good example of a high-quality post-war office building. It is considered one of the finest modernist towers in the United Kingdom alongside the sister building CIS Tower (1962, Grade II), the Arts Tower in Sheffield (Grade II*) and Euston Tower (1970) in London. It is described in its listing as "A design of discipline and consistency which forms part of a group with the Co-operative Insurance Society".

NOMA
In 2013 Co-operative Group employees migrated from New Century House to One Angel Square. New Century House is now part of the NOMA redevelopment scheme. Office and kitchen space in New Century House is available to local small to medium-sized businesses.  New Century Hall is now available as a venue.

References

Sources

Grade II listed buildings in Manchester
Office buildings completed in 1962
International style architecture in England